Paul 'Trouble' Anderson (28 September 1959 – 2 December 2018) was a British DJ, playing soul, disco, funk, and house music and known for his long-running Kiss FM show. He worked as a dance music DJ in clubs from 1979 until his death in 2018. He produced a number of mix albums and remixed records by other artists.

Biography

Anderson was born in East London.

In 1985 he helped found Kiss FM, the UK's first legal dance music radio station, with Gordon Mac. From 1990 to 1998 he hosted a prime time Saturday Kiss FM show from 9 to 11 pm. Mixmag called the show "the official start to any night out happening in London Town during the 1990s"; Radio Today called it "a pre-clubbing ritual for a whole generation of nineties Londoners"; Greg Wilson called it "something of a pre-clubbing institution for Londoners, Paul undoubtedly one of the most influential DJs of the period."

From 2012 up until his death, Anderson played on Mi-Soul, the London radio station set-up by Mac.

He died on 2 December 2018, aged 59.

Discography

Mix albums
The Sound Of New York (Eightball, 1994)
Creative Garage (with Noel Watson) (Club Masters, 1996)
Trouble On The Dancefloor (X:treme, 1997)
Trouble's House (R2, 2000)

Compilation albums
Classic House Mastercuts Volume 2 (Mastercuts, 1994)

Singles
"Greedy T" (Unquantize, 2017)

References

External links

1959 births
2018 deaths
DJs from London